Yan ang Morning! is a 2016 Philippine television talk show broadcast by GMA Network. Hosted by Marian Rivera, it premiered on May 2, 2016 on the network's morning line up. The show concluded on August 12, 2016 with a total of 79 episodes. It was replaced by H2O: Just Add Water in its timeslot.

Hosts

 Marian Rivera
 Boobay

Specials
 RealiTRIP
2016, It shows the bonding of the hosts and the guests as Marian and Boobay share us their daily adventures, foodtrips and roadtrips. 
 Kwento Ng Nanay Mo
2016, A dramedic skit by which they will tackle some of real-life relationship situations and trials between their husbands, parents-in-law, children and more.
 Yanyan Meets Naynay
2016, Marian will surprise mothers and will help them bring back the charm they had before.
 Hugot Multiples
2016, The host will provide multiple choices which asks 'Hugot' questions. A dramatic skit will flash on the screen while the guests will give opinion to the 'martyr' one.

Ratings
According to AGB Nielsen Philippines' Mega Manila household television ratings, the pilot episode of Yan ang Morning! earned an 11.8% rating. While the final episode scored an 8.6% rating in Urban Luzon television ratings.

References

External links
 

2016 Philippine television series debuts
2016 Philippine television series endings
Filipino-language television shows
GMA Network original programming
Philippine television talk shows